Ivan Božović (born 25 May 1990) is a Serbian footballer who plays for Balzan.

External links
  at Srbijafudbal.
  at Utakmica.rs

1986 births
Sportspeople from Kragujevac
Living people
Serbian footballers
Association football defenders
FK Radnički 1923 players
OFK Beograd players
FK Smederevo players
FK Donji Srem players
FK Jedinstvo Užice players
FK Zemun players
Balzan F.C. players
FC Lori players
FK Timok players
Serbian First League players
Serbian SuperLiga players
Maltese Premier League players
Armenian Premier League players
Serbian expatriate footballers
Expatriate footballers in Malta
Expatriate footballers in Armenia